Oh Mercy! is a 2019 French crime drama film directed by Arnaud Desplechin. The film was inspired by the 2008 TV documentary Roubaix, commissariat central, directed by Mosco Boucault. It stars Roschdy Zem, Léa Seydoux, Sara Forestier, and Antoine Reinartz. It was selected to compete for the Palme d'Or at the 2019 Cannes Film Festival.

Plot
One Christmas night in Roubaix, the local police chief Daoud, and Louis, a fresh recruit, are confronted with the violent murder of an elderly woman. The victim's two young, female neighbours, Claude and Marie, are arrested.

Cast

Release
The film had its world premiere in the Competition section at the 2019 Cannes Film Festival on 22 May 2019. It was released in France on 21 August 2019.

Reception

Critical response
On Metacritic, the film has a weighted average score of 51 out of 100, based on 9 critics, indicating "mixed or average reviews".

David Ehrlich of IndieWire gave the film a grade of C−, writing, "Forestier and Seydoux are both fantastically desperate as dead end citizens who met each other at a very dangerous time in their lives, but Desplechin fails to make full use of his actors; instead of allowing them to shade in their characters, he pummels the audience into an ambiguous state of forced sympathy." Chuck Bowen of Slant Magazine gave the film 3 out of 4 stars, commenting that "The film's master image is among the greatest images of Desplechin's career: the women, recreating their strangulation of the victim for the police, briefly hold their hands together under the victim's pillow."

Accolades

References

External links
 

2019 films
2019 crime drama films
2010s French-language films
French crime drama films
Films directed by Arnaud Desplechin
Films with screenplays by Arnaud Desplechin
2010s French films